The Revised Code of Washington (RCW) is the compilation of all permanent laws currently in force in the U.S. state of Washington.  Temporary laws such as appropriations acts are excluded. It is published by the Washington State Statute Law Committee and the Washington State Code Reviser which it employs and supervises.

See also
 Code Reviser
 Law of Washington (state)

References

External links
 Revised Code of Washington from the Washington State Legislative Service Center
 Revised Code of Washington archive from the Washington State Legislative Service Center
 Revised Code of Washington from Socratek

Washington
Washington (state) law

HUGMA